Homein (Burmese: ဟိုမိန်းမြို့, MLCTS: hui.min.mrui) also known as Homong, Homöng, Ho Mong and Wān Ho-möng, is a village in Langkho Township, Langkho District, southern Shan State, Myanmar (Burma).

Geography
Though there are no legal crossings, Homein lies in a porous mountainous area, 15 km northeast of Loi Lan mountain and 5.7 km west from the border with Mae Hong Son Province of Thailand.  The Salween River to the immediate north isolates this region somewhat from the rest of the nation, a road (dubious quality) connects from Langkho to onward points.

History
Owing to its location east of the Salween and the lack of adequate roads this village was of difficult access for the operations of the Tatmadaw. Beginning in 1985 it served as the headquarters of different Shan insurgent groups, such as the Mong Tai Army —until 1996 when this group ceased operations, the Shan State National Army and the Shan State Army - South. At that time the village also became a drug traffic hub where drug kingpin Khun Sa found security and carried his deals with impunity.

Further reading
 Map - Districts of Shan (South) State

References

External links
Chronology for Shans in Myanmar (Burma)

Populated places in Shan State
Myanmar–Thailand border